Phillip John Costa (born 24 July 1949) is an Australian politician. He was a Labor Party member of the New South Wales Legislative Assembly from 2007 until 2011, representing the electorate of Wollondilly. He served as Minister for Water and Minister for Corrective Services.

Early life
Costa was born on 24 July 1949 at Guildford, New South Wales. Prior to his election he was a primary school teacher and principal of public schools in the Oaks and Buxton. He was named the Citizen of the Year in Wollondilly Shire in 1984.

Politics
Costa was first elected to Wollondilly Shire Council in 1985; he continued serving on the Council until 2008. He served as Deputy Mayor from 1999 to 2005 before being elected as Mayor from 2006 to 2007, immediately prior to the 2007 state election.

Costa initially planned to stand as an independent candidate in the 2007 state election but was persuaded by Premier Morris Iemma to stand instead for the Labor Party. He was elected to the Legislative Assembly on 24 March 2007 with 53% of the vote. From June 2007 to September 2008, he was a member of the State Parliament's Standing Committee on Parliamentary Privilege and Ethics and Chair of the Standing Committee on Broadband in Rural and Regional Communities.

From 8 September 2008 to 4 December 2009, he was appointed Minister for Water, Minister for Rural Affairs and Minister for Regional Development in the Cabinet of incoming Premier Nathan Rees.

In 2011 he lost Wollondilly to Liberal Jai Rowell as part of an anti-Labor landslide in that year. Later moving to the NSW North Coast, Costa was the unsuccessful Labor candidate for the Federal seat of Lyne in the 2019 election.

Relationship with Wollondilly Council
Costa was elected Mayor of Wollondilly in 2007, standing as an independent candidate. His decision to join the Labor Party was opposed by other councillors who called on him to resign the mayoralty. Council subsequently passed a motion limiting the mayor's powers. Numerous Wollondilly councillors also expressed opposition to Costa's 2008 support for a new commuter car park at Macarthur Railway Station, and for a 2009 proposal for an AGL power station near Appin.

Personal life
Costa is married with two adult children. He is not related to Parliamentary colleague and former Treasurer Michael Costa.

References

External links
 Inaugural speech in NSW Parliament
 

|-

|-

1949 births
Living people
Members of the New South Wales Legislative Assembly
Australian Labor Party members of the Parliament of New South Wales
Australian headmasters
Deputy mayors of places in Australia
Mayors of places in New South Wales
Wollondilly Shire
21st-century Australian politicians